Nag Mundari is a Unicode block containing the letters for writing the Mundari language. Nag Mundari is encoded as a unicameral alphabet. The Nag Mundari block contains 27 letters plus five diacritics and ten digits.

Block

History
The following Unicode-related documents record the purpose and process of defining specific characters in the Nag Mundari block:

References

Unicode blocks